Andrey or Andrei Tarasenko may refer to:
Andrey Tarasenko (ice hockey) (born 1968), Russian ice hockey player
Andrey Tarasenko (powerlifter) (born 1975), Russian powerlifter
Andrey Tarasenko (politician) (born 1963), Russian politician